Nigel Travis is an English businessman and corporate executive. Travis was the CEO of the Dunkin' Brands group from January 2009 to July 2018. He has served the board at other corporations, including Papa John's and Blockbuster.

History
Travis was born in Woodford, England into an entrepreneurial family. His father had several businesses including a uniform business, a twine and rope wholesaling business, and a toy distribution business. Travis graduated from Middlesex University with a bachelor's degree in business administration and worked for Esso, Rolls-Royce, Kraft and Parker Hannifin the field of human resources.

In 1985 he joined the conglomerate Grand Metropolitan in human resources and in 1986 became Group management development director. Following the acquisition of Pillsbury and Burger King by Grand Metropolitan in late 1988 he moved to Miami, Florida where he joined Burger King as SVP, Human Resources. In 1991 he returned to England in his first operations role with Burger King as managing director for Europe, Middle East & Africa.

1990s
Nigel joined Blockbuster. in 1994 as Senior Vice President, Europe and over the next 10 years was promoted to various positions which included both US and International retail operations.

2000s
In 2001, Travis was promoted by Blockbuster as president and chief operating officer (the number two position) and stayed in that role for three years. In 2005, he was hired by Papa John's Pizza to serve as president and CEO.

Dunkin' Brands
In 2008, Travis was hired by Dunkin' Brands to lead as its CEO. Dunkin’ Brands became a publicly held company in 2011 (DNKN). During Travis's time at Dunkin' Brands, the company added 3,300 new Dunkin' Donuts and Baskin-Robbins shops. In 2010, Travis said his vision was continually to expand Dunkin' Brand's presence in the Southeastern United States and internationally, and that China would be a major focus. He retired from Dunkin’ in December 2018.

Retirement
Travis served as chairman, Dunkin’ Brands until December 2020. He is a member of the board of directors for Advance Auto Parts and Abercrombie & Fitch. He is also Chairman of Fooda based in Chicago and Servpro.

Personal life
Nigel Travis has been a fan of the English football club Leyton Orient F.C. since he was a young boy. In June 2017, he led a consortium that rescued the club. He is married to Joanna Travis and has two children with her, Ian and Brooke Travis. He has a son, David Travis, from a prior marriage.

References 

American chief executives
English chief executives
Year of birth missing (living people)
Living people
Inspire Brands
Alumni of Middlesex University
21st-century American businesspeople
20th-century British businesspeople
21st-century British businesspeople
English football chairmen and investors
Leyton Orient F.C.
Businesspeople from London